Case Andrews Cunningham is a United States Air Force major general who is currently serving as commander of the United States Air Force Warfare Center. He previously served as the director of plans, programs, and requirements of the Air Combat Command.

References

External links

Living people
Year of birth missing (living people)
Place of birth missing (living people)
United States Air Force generals